San Lorenzo is a mountain in Sierra de la Demanda, which is part of La Rioja autonomous community, in Spain.

External links 
 Monte San Lorenzo | La Rioja

References 

Mountains of Spain
Landforms of La Rioja (Spain)
Two-thousanders of Spain